Winter Soldier is a 1972 American documentary film chronicling the Winter Soldier Investigation, which took place in Detroit, Michigan, from January 31 to February 2, 1971. The film documents the accounts of American soldiers who returned from the War in Vietnam and participated in this war crimes hearing.

The many documentary filmmakers in the Winterfilm Collective (listed as Winterfilm, Inc. in the credits to the film Winter Soldier) consisted of: Rusty Sachs, Barbara Kopple, Fred Aranow, Nancy Baker, Joe Bangert, Rhetta Barron, Robert Fiore, David Gillis, David Grubin, Jeff Holstein, Barbara Jarvis, Al Kaupas, Mark Lenix, Michael Lesser, Nancy Miller, Lee Osborne, Lucy Massie Phenix, Roger Phenix, Benay Rubenstein, and Michael Weil. The collective produced the 1971 film documentary about the Winter Soldier Hearings in Detroit, as well as associated anti-war protests and marches.

Participants 
Veterans who appeared in the film included (in order of appearance):
 Rusty Sachs, 1st Marine Air Wing
 Joseph Bangert, 1st Marine Air Wing
 Scott Shimabukuro, 3rd Marine Division
 Kenneth Campbell, 1st Marine Division
 Scott Camil, 1st Marine Division
 John Kerry, Coastal Divisions 11 & 13, USN
 Steve Pitkin, 9th Infantry Division
 Jonathan Birch, 3rd Marine Division
 Charles Stevens, 101st Airborne Division
 Fred Nienke, 1st Marine Division
 David Bishop, 1st Marine Division
 Nathan Hale, Americal Division
 Michael Hunter, 1st Infantry Division
 Murphy Lloyd, 173rd Airborne Brigade
 Carl Rippberger, 9th Infantry Division
 Evan Haney, US Naval Support Activity
 Robert Clark, 3rd Marine Division
 Gordon Stewart, 3rd Marine Division
 Curtis Windgrodsky, Americal Division
 Gary Keyes, Americal Division
 Allan Akers, 3rd Marine Division
 William Hatton, 3rd Marine Division
 Joseph Galbally, Americal Division
 Edmund Murphy, Americal Division
 James Duffy, 1st Air Cavalry Division
 Scott Moore, 9th Infantry Division
 Mark Lenix, 9th Infantry Division
 Thomas Heidtman, 1st Marine Division
 Dennis Caldwell, 1st Aviation Brigade
 James Henry

War crimes allegations 
The film, shot largely in black and white, features testimony by soldiers who participated in or witnessed atrocities in Vietnam: the killing of civilians, including children; mutilation of bodies; indiscriminate razing of villages; throwing prisoners out of helicopters; and other acts of cruelty towards Vietnamese civilians and combatants. Some participants also claimed that these acts reflected orders from higher-up officers. A number of soldiers are quoted stating that their military training failed to include instruction in the terms of the Geneva Convention, while others state that the dangers they faced as soldiers created an environment in which they regarded all Vietnamese as hostile "gooks" and stopped seeing them as human beings.

In testimony by Joseph Bangert, he describes traveling in a "truckload of grunt Marines" when "there were some Vietnamese children at the gateway of the village and they gave the old finger gesture at us. It was understandable that they picked this up from GIs there. They stopped the trucks — they didn't stop the truck, they slowed down a little bit, and it was just like response, the guys got up, including the lieutenants, and just blew all the kids away. There were about five or six kids blown away, and then the truck just continued down the hill."

In addition to soldiers' testimony, the film includes color footage and photographic evidence to support some of the testimony.

Reception 
At the time of its original release in 1972, Winter Soldier was greeted with skepticism and largely ignored by the mainstream media. "Only the local Detroit Free Press bothered to confirm the veracity of accounts and the credentials of participants," according to Johnny Ray Huston in a 2005 review of the film and its impact. "Television primarily turned a blind eye, and conservative publications like the Detroit News cast doubt on the allegations made without offering any specific proof of deception." The ABC, NBC, CBS and PBS television networks were offered opportunities to broadcast the film but declined. For the first 30 years after its release, the film was shown sporadically in arthouse settings.

In 2005, the film was re-released in theaters, this time attracting mostly favorable reviews. Writing in The Washington Post, Ann Hornaday called it "a riveting example of pure filmic storytelling. ... 'Winter Soldier' is an important historical document, an eerily prescient antiwar plea and a dazzling example of filmmaking at its most iconographically potent. But at its best, it is the eloquent, unforgettable tale of profound moral reckoning."

On review aggregation website Rotten Tomatoes the film has a rating of 100% based on reviews from 21 critics, with an average rating of 8.14/10.

References

External links
 
 
 

1972 films
American documentary films
Documentary films about the Vietnam War
War crimes in Vietnam
Documentary films alleging war crimes
1972 documentary films
1970s English-language films
1970s American films